Robert Paul Pula (December 3, 1928–January 11, 2004) was a director emeritus of the Institute of General Semantics, author of A General-Semantics Glossary, and a composer. Pula served as the lead lecturer for the Institute of General Semantics for many years.  He also edited the General Semantics Bulletin from 1977 to 1985, and served as the Director of the institute from 1983 to 1986.  In 1993 he wrote the "Preface to the Fifth Edition" of Alfred Korzybski's Science and Sanity.  He was a polymathic poet, painter, pianistic composer, Polka historian, Polish culturalist, cartoonist, writer, editor, and teacher.

See also 
General semantics
Institute of General Semantics
Alfred Korzybski

References

External links 

Bob Pula: Interview on Alfred Korzybski & General Semantics, November 16, 2003

1929 births
2004 deaths
General semantics
Communication scholars
American people of Polish descent